Sins of the Night is a 1993 American thriller and crime film directed by Gregory Dark, produced by Andrew W. Garroni, and starring  Nick Cassavetes, Deborah Shelton, Miles O'Keeffe and Richard Roundtree in the lead roles. Its music was composed by Ashley Irwin.

Cast
 Nick Cassavetes as Jack Neitsche
 Deborah Shelton as Roxanne Flowers
 Miles O'Keeffe as Tony Falcone
 Richard Roundtree as Les
 Matt Roe as Ted Quincy
 Courtney Taylor as Danielle
 Michelle Moffett as Kay
 Lee Anne Beaman as Sue Ellen
 Kelly Royce as Laurel Conrad
 Michele Brin as Laura Winters

References

External links
 
 

1993 films
American crime thriller films
1993 crime thriller films
1990s English-language films
1990s American films